Eloisa Biasotto Mano (October 24, 1924 – June 8, 2019) was a Brazilian chemist and full university professor. She was a specialist in polymers, and enjoyed worldwide recognition for her work. She was a recipient of the National Order of Scientific Merit.

Early life and education
Eloisa Biasotto Mano was born in Rio de Janeiro, October 24, 1924. She received degrees in industrial chemistry (1947), chemical engineering (1955), and a doctorate in organic chemistry (1960). She studied polymer science at the University of Illinois and at the University of Birmingham.

Career
In Brazil, she formed the first group of researchers in the area of polymers, which gave rise to the Institute of Macromolecules of Federal University of Rio de Janeiro (UFRJ), later renamed in her honor. Mano taught organic chemistry at the Institute of Chemistry, UFRJ, where she was a full professor. She supervised many master's and doctoral theses. In her classes, Mano was always keen to demonstrate practically the properties of different materials and their characterizations. She received the National Order of Scientific Merit for her contribution to science. She was a full member of the Brazilian Academy of Sciences since 1978. In 1994, she became Professor Emeritus.

Mano died in Rio de Janeiro, June 8, 2019.

Awards and honors
 2000, Grand Cross, National Order of Scientific Merit
 2000, City of Rio de Janeiro Award for Science and Technology
 2001, Simão Medal, Matias, Brazilian Chemical Society (SBQ)
 2003, creation of the Profa Prize. Eloisa Bro, Brazilian Polymer Association

Selected works
 Praticas de quimica organica, 1969
 Modified Lignan Polymers from the Resin of Paraná Pine Tree Knots
 Introducao a polimeros, 1999
 Identificação de plásticos, borrachas e fibras, 2000
 Tensile behavior of irradiated recycled polyolefin plastics, 2000
 Química experimental de polímeros, 2004
 Meio ambiente, poluição e reciclagem, 2005
 O impacto do acordo NAS/CNPq na evolução da Química no Brasil: o setor de polímeros, 2007
 Natural Polymer Characterization, 2007
 Polímeros como materiais de engenharia, 2019

References

1924 births
2019 deaths
People from Rio de Janeiro (city)
Brazilian chemists
20th-century British educators
Polymers
University of Illinois Urbana-Champaign alumni
Alumni of the University of Birmingham
Academic staff of the Federal University of Rio de Janeiro
Recipients of the National Order of Scientific Merit (Brazil)
Brazilian science writers
20th-century Brazilian women writers
21st-century Brazilian women writers
21st-century Brazilian writers
Brazilian expatriates in the United Kingdom
Brazilian expatriates in the United States